A Monkey in Winter is a 1959 novel by the French writer Antoine Blondin. It tells the story of a reformed alcohol addict who runs a small hotel in Normandy and has promised his wife to never drink alcohol again. To support a guest, a man who is nervous because he is to meet his daughter for the first time, he tells war stories and begins to drink to infuse courage. An English translation by Robert Baldick was published in 1960.

The book received the 1959 Prix Interallié. It was the basis for the 1962 film A Monkey in Winter, starring Jean Gabin and Jean-Paul Belmondo.

See also
 1959 in literature
 French literature

References

1959 French novels
French novels adapted into films
French-language novels
Novels by Antoine Blondin
Novels set in Normandy
Novels about alcoholism